Radancy, formerly known as TMP Worldwide Advertising & Communications, LLC, is an independent technology company that provides SaaS for recruitment and talent acquisition. Headquartered in New York City, the company has 14 offices in the United States, as well as international locations in Brazil, Canada, Germany, France, the United Kingdom, India and Singapore.

History
In 1967, Andrew McKelvey founded Telephone Marketing Programs (TMP), a directional marketing company, focused on Yellow Pages advertising. In 1993, McKelvey partnered with recruitment advertising innovator Don Tendler, formerly of Davis & Dorand, to launch and grow a recruitment division for TMP. In 1995 TMP's recruitment division acquired The Monster Board and Online Career Center (OCC). TMP Worldwide went public in 1996 and its career websites grew and eventually merged as Monster.com in 1999.

In 1999, TMP Worldwide acquired LAI Worldwide (NASDAQ:LAIX), formerly Lamalie Associates, to create an executive search division.

TMP Worldwide was officially renamed Monster Worldwide in 2003, with Monster and TMP Worldwide as sister divisions. The former eResourcing and Executive Search divisions of TMP were also spun off to create Hudson Highland Group. The Yellow Pages directional marketing division was sold in 2005.

On August 31, 2006, TMP Worldwide senior management and VSS Mezzanine Partners purchased the assets of TMP Worldwide Advertising and Communications from Monster Worldwide. In September 2007, TMP acquired UK-based People in Business Limited (PIB), an employer brand consultancy firm.

In September 2012, TMP acquired AIA, an employment and recruitment communications firm based in London. The company further expanded by establishing offices in Germany in 2011 and Brazil in 2014. In 2019, it acquired other companies including of CKR Interactive, Perengo, Carve and Maximum.

On January 26, 2021, TMP rebranded under the name Radancy and encompassed its various offerings under a single united recruitment marketing and metrics platform.

Recognition
Radancy, then TMP Worldwide, had won the Silver Specialist Agency of the Year award at the Indian Agency Awards in 2019.

References

Advertising agencies of the United States
Companies based in New York City
Marketing companies established in 1967
1967 establishments in New York (state)